Melissa Warburg Rosenberg (previously Endicott; born January 20, 1968), known professionally as Melissa Rivers, is an American actress and television host. She is the only child of the late comedian Joan Rivers and producer Edgar Rosenberg.

Early life
Melissa Warburg Rosenberg was born on January 20, 1968, in New York City. She is the only child of Joan Rivers and Edgar Rosenberg. She spent the majority of her childhood in Los Angeles, California. She attended the John Thomas Dye School, Marlborough School, and The Buckley School. Rivers first started dancing at the age of 8, taking once-a-week group lessons. She became more serious about the activity at the age of 12, taking regular private lessons.

Rivers attended the University of Pennsylvania, where in 1989 she graduated with a Bachelor of Arts in history. During her second year of college, her father Edgar died by suicide. In 1990, she took on her mother's stage surname, after which she became known as Melissa Rivers.

Career
As an actress, she has had roles in television shows including Beverly Hills 90210, Silk Stalkings and The Comeback. In 1998, she also appeared in the sci-fi/comedy made-for-television movie Men in White and in the 1999 film The Big Tease, a comedy directed by Kevin Allen starring Craig Ferguson. She and her mother, Joan Rivers, portrayed themselves in the 1994 celebrity docudrama Tears and Laughter: The Joan and Melissa Rivers Story.

In the early 1990s, she branched out on the pre-show red carpet, interviewing celebrities on nationally televised awards shows. Rivers, who has hosted various events and served as a producer for the E! Network, has hosted two of the channel's highest-rated specials: Oh Baby! Melissa’s Guide to Pregnancy and Oh Toddler! Surviving the Early Years (aired in January 2002).

With her mother, she hosted fashion on the red carpet interviews for the E! cable network. In 2003, they left the red carpet pre-show on E! to accept a more lucrative deal with the TV Guide Channel valued at between $6 and $8 million. Also in 2003, she appeared on the ABC Network competitive reality show I'm a Celebrity... Get Me Out of Here!. She has been a regular guest on the webcast show Tom Green's House Tonight.

In 2013, she was a co-creator and co-producer of Joan's YouTube web series In Bed With Joan, a 15- to 30-minute show with a new video uploaded weekly in which Joan interviewed a celebrity about a wide variety of personal topics in Joan's bed, with Melissa conducting interview questions for the last several minutes. Featured videos that have garnered the most views featured comedians Kathy Griffin, Sarah Silverman, and Margaret Cho, television personalities Kelly Osbourne and RuPaul, as well as Youtubers Jenna Mourey (Jenna "Marbles"), Grace Helbig ("itsgrace") and Justine Ezarik ("iJustine"). Other guests included Russell Peters, Gary Busey, Rob Delaney, Gabriel Iglesias, Carmen Electra, Lance Bass, Howie Mandel, Chris Hardwick, Bill Engvall, Tom Green, Penn Jillette, Aisha Tyler, Anthony Jeselnik, Nick Kroll and T.J. Miller. In 2013, Melissa and Joan were honored by the Ride of Fame and a double decker tour bus was dedicated to them.

On August 31, 2015, Fashion Police began featuring Rivers as a co-host.

Philanthropy
In 2003, she appeared in a PETA anti-fur ad campaign, encouraging consumers to "Fake It...for the Animals' Sake."

She raised $100,000 for the Make-A-Wish Foundation, resulting from ABC's 2006 television show I'm a Celebrity... Get Me Out of Here! Live. On June 24, 2008, Rivers appeared on the NBC game show Celebrity Family Feud as part of the Rivers Family Team. She and her mother first battled against the Ice-T Family Team, then went on to compete against the Raven-Symoné Family Team. They won $50,000 for their charity, Guide Dogs for the Blind.

She appeared on the NBC reality television program Celebrity Apprentice playing for the Lili Claire Foundation. She was fired in the episode that aired April 26, 2009, after which she stormed out of the boardroom, verbally assaulted teammates Annie Duke and Brande Roderick, yelled at the production crew, and refused the obligatory exit interview. Her mother was also a contestant on that season of The Apprentice, and threatened to quit the show after Melissa's firing, but remained and ultimately won the competition.

She raised $22,250 on a special celebrity edition of Who Wants to Be a Millionaire, where all the celebrities played to raise money for the research of Alzheimer's disease.

Personal life
Rivers married horse trainer John Endicott in December 1998, at New York City's Plaza Hotel in a $3 million wedding. They divorced in 2003. She has one son from that marriage, Edgar Cooper Endicott (born in 2000) who was featured with Rivers and her mother in the reality show Joan & Melissa: Joan Knows Best? She was in a relationship with sports coach Jason Zimmerman from 2008 to 2011.

On January 26, 2015, Rivers filed a malpractice lawsuit against the clinic and doctors who performed surgery on her mother that caused her death.

From 2015 to 2021, Rivers was in a relationship with talent agent Mark Rousso.

Filmography

Books
 (Biography/Humor)

Honors
On March 1, 2013, Rivers and her mother, Joan Rivers, were honored by the Ride of Fame and a double decker tour bus was dedicated to them in New York City.

References

External links

1968 births
Living people
Actresses from New York City
American female equestrians
American people of German-Jewish descent
American people of Russian-Jewish descent
American television hosts
American women in business
Businesspeople from Los Angeles
Businesspeople from New York City
Jewish American actresses
Jewish American philanthropists
Joan Rivers
Participants in American reality television series
People from Los Angeles County, California
People from the Upper East Side
Television producers from New York City
University of Pennsylvania alumni
Television producers from California
Philanthropists from New York (state)
American women television producers
American women television presenters
The Apprentice (franchise) contestants